Dean Whipple (born April 3, 1938) is a Senior United States district judge of the United States District Court for the Western District of Missouri.

Education and career

Born in Lebanon, Missouri on April 3, 1938, Whipple received an Artium Baccalaureus degree from Drury University in 1961 and a Juris Doctor from the University of Missouri–Kansas City School of Law in 1965. He was in private practice in Lebanon from 1967 to 1974. He was a prosecuting attorney of Laclede County, Missouri from 1967 to 1971. He was a judge of the 26th Judicial Circuit Court of the State of Missouri from 1975 to 1987.

Federal judicial service

On September 14, 1987, Whipple was nominated by President Ronald Reagan to a seat on the United States District Court for the Western District of Missouri vacated by Judge Ross Thompson Roberts. Whipple was confirmed by the United States Senate on December 8, 1987, and received his commission the following day. He served as Chief Judge from 2000 to 2007, assuming senior status on April 30, 2007. He was succeeded by Judge David Gregory Kays.

References

Sources
 

1938 births
Living people
People from Lebanon, Missouri
Drury University alumni
University of Missouri–Kansas City alumni
Missouri state court judges
Judges of the United States District Court for the Western District of Missouri
United States district court judges appointed by Ronald Reagan
20th-century American judges
21st-century American judges